Christian Coral Cleveland Covington (born October 16, 1993) is a Canadian professional American football defensive end for the Los Angeles Chargers of the National Football League (NFL). He played college football at Rice and was drafted by the Houston Texans in the sixth round of the 2015 NFL Draft. He has also been a member of the Dallas Cowboys, Denver Broncos, and Cincinnati Bengals.

Early years
Covington was born in Vancouver, British Columbia, and attended Vancouver College. As a senior, he contributed to the team winning the Provincial Championship, while tallying 83 tackles, 15 sacks, 6 fumble recoveries, one interception, 3 forced fumbles and 2 defensive touchdowns in 14 games. 

He received Provincial Defensive MVP, first-team All-Canadian and Academic All-Canadian honors. He finished his prep career with 276 tackles and 38 sacks.

College career
Covington accepted a football scholarship from Rice University. As a redshirt freshman in 2011, he appeared in 12 games at defensive tackle. He had 43 tackles (8 for loss), five sacks, 20 quarterback hurries, one pass breakup and one forced fumble.

As a sophomore in 2013, he was named the starting nose tackle and received first-team All–C-USA honors. He contributed to the school winning its first football conference title in 56 years. He suffered right thumb injury and was forced to play with a cast in the last 5 contests. He recorded 14 game appearances, 59 tackles (11.5 for loss), four sacks and one blocked field goal. 

As a junior in 2014, he appeared in seven games, posting with 20 tackles (3.5 tackles for loss) and 2.5 sacks. He suffered a season ending dislocated kneecap in the eighth game against Florida International University. He had 7 tackles against Army. He made 5 tackles, 1.5 sacks and one pass breakup against North Texas. 

He opted to declare for the 2015 NFL Draft after the season. He finished his college career with 33 game appearances, 119 tackles (23 for loss), 11.5 sacks, 4 forced fumbles, 4 pass break ups and 2 blocked kicks.

Professional career

Houston Texans
Covington was selected by the Houston Texans in the sixth round (216th overall) of the 2015 NFL Draft. He was also selected by the BC Lions in the fifth round (43rd overall) of the 2015 CFL Draft. As a rookie, he appeared in 15 games as backup defensive end in the team's 3-4 defense. He had 8 tackles (4 for loss) and 2 sacks.

In 2016, he appeared in 16 games with 5 starts as the left defensive end in the team's 3-4 defense. He tallied 26 tackles (2 for loss), one sack and one pass breakup. He had 5 tackles, one sack and one pass defensed in the season finale against the Tennessee Titans.

In 2017, he appeared in 7 games with 2 starts, registering 16 tackles, one sack and one forced fumble. In Week 8, Covington suffered a torn bicep against the Seattle Seahawks and was ruled out the rest of the season. He was placed on the injured reserve list on October 31. He had 3 tackles, one sack and one forced fumble against the New England Patriots.

In 2018, He started two out of 12 games, collecting 15 tackles (four for loss), 3.5 sacks and 8 quarterback pressures. He had four tackles (two for loss), 2.5 sacks and three quarterback hurries against the Tennessee Titans.

Dallas Cowboys
On March 14, 2019, Covington signed a one-year deal with the Dallas Cowboys. He was a backup defensive tackle in the team's 4-3 defense. He appeared in 16 games with 6 starts in place of an injured Antwaun Woods, while registered 26 tackles (4 for loss), one sack, 15 quarterback pressures and one pass breakup.

Denver Broncos
On April 28, 2020, Covington signed a one-year, $1.75 million contract with the Denver Broncos.

Cincinnati Bengals
On September 4, 2020, Covington was traded to the Cincinnati Bengals, in exchange for linebacker Austin Calitro. He was expected to be the backup nose tackle behind D. J. Reader in the team's 3-4 defense. He played in all 16 games with 14 starts, finishing with a career-high 39 tackles.

Los Angeles Chargers

Covington signed with the Los Angeles Chargers on May 11, 2021. He played in 16 games with three starts, recording a career-high 52 tackles, a forced fumble and a sack.

On March 17, 2022, Covington re-signed with the Chargers. He was released on August 30, 2022 and signed to the practice squad the next day. He was promoted to the active roster on September 12. He was placed on injured reserve on November 16, 2022.

Personal life
His father, Grover Covington is the Canadian Football League (CFL) all-time sacks leader (157) and is a member of the Canadian Football Hall of Fame.

References

External links
Los Angeles Chargers bio
Rice Owls bio

1993 births
Living people
Canadian people of African-American descent
Ice hockey people from Vancouver
Black Canadian players of American football
American football defensive tackles
Rice Owls football players
Houston Texans players
Dallas Cowboys players
Denver Broncos players
Cincinnati Bengals players
Los Angeles Chargers players
Gridiron football people from British Columbia